A swivel is a type of connection that allows for rotation.

Swivel may also refer to:
 Swivel chair, a chair that can spin around
 Swivel LCD, another name for an articulating screen
 Swivel lens, a lens that freely rotates while attached to a camera body
 Swivel seat, a seat that can spin 90° or 180° but can not move laterally unless it is mounted on a rail
 Fishing swivel
 Swivel gun
 Swivel (form), a type of mobile phone form factor
 Swivel (drill rig), a mechanical device used on a drilling rig
 DJ Swivel (born 1984), Canadian music producer and DJ
 "go swivel" an insult (derogatory, slang, vulgar)

See also
 
 
 Swerve (disambiguation)